The 2007 Trophée des Champions was a football match held at Stade Gerland, Lyon on 28 July 2007, that saw 2006–07 Ligue 1 champions Lyon defeat 2006–07 Coupe de France winners Sochaux 2–1 thanks to goals by Sidney Govou and Cris.

Match details

See also
2006–07 Ligue 1
2006–07 Coupe de France

External links
Match Statistics

2007–08 in French football
2007
Olympique Lyonnais matches
FC Sochaux-Montbéliard matches
July 2007 sports events in France
Sports competitions in Lyon